Each version of the UNIX Time-Sharing System evolved from the version before, with version one evolving from the prototypal Unix. Not all variants and descendants are displayed.

Research Unix 

{| style="background-color: transparent; width: 100%"
|  align="left" valign="top" |
"Ken's new system" (Unics → Unix) (1969)
UNIX Time-Sharing System v1 (1971)
UNIX Time-Sharing System v2 (1972)
UNIX Time-Sharing System v3 (1973)
UNIX Time-Sharing System v4 (1973)
UNIX Time-Sharing System v5 (1974)
UNSW 01 (1978)
UNIX Time-Sharing System v6 (1975)
Mini-UNIX (1977)
PWB/UNIX 1.0 (1977)
USG 1.0
CB UNIX 1
UNIX Time-Sharing System v7 (1979)
UNIX System III (1981)
UNIX Time-Sharing System v8 (1985)
UNIX Time-Sharing System v9 (1986)
UNIX Time-Sharing System v10 (1989)
|}

The versions leading to v7 are also sometimes called Ancient unix. After the release of Version 10, the Unix research team at Bell Labs turned its focus to Plan 9 from Bell Labs, a distinct operating system that was first released to the public in 1993.

AT&T UNIX Systems and descendants 

Each of the systems in this list is evolved from the version before, with Unix System III evolving from both the UNIX Time-Sharing System v7 and the descendants of the UNIX Time-Sharing System v6.

{| style="background-color: transparent; width: 100%"

|  align="left" valign="top" |
UNIX System III (1981)
UNIX System IV (1982)
UNIX System V (1983)
UNIX System V Release 2 (1984)
UNIX System V Release 3.0 (1986)
UNIX System V Release 3.2 (1987)
UNIX System V Release 4 (1988)
UNIX System V Release 4.2 (1992)
UnixWare 1.1 (1993)
UnixWare 1.1.1 (1994)
UnixWare 2.0 (1995)
UnixWare 2.1 (1996)
UnixWare 2.1.2 (1996)

|  align="left" valign="top" |
UnixWare 7 (System V Release 5) (1998)
UnixWare 7.0.1 (1998)
UnixWare 7.1 (1999)
UnixWare 7.1.1 (1999)
UnixWare NSC 7.1+IP (2000)
UnixWare NSC 7.1+LKP (2000)
UnixWare NSC 7.1DCFS (2000)
Open Unix 8 (UnixWare 7.1.2) (2001)
Open Unix 8MP1 (2001)
Open Unix 8MP2 (2001)
Open Unix 8MP3 (2002)
Open Unix 8MP4 (2002)
SCO UnixWare 7.1.3 (2002)
SCO UnixWare 7.1.3 Update Pack 1 (2003)
SCO UnixWare 7.1.4 (2004)

|}

Unix-like operating systems

AIX
BSD
Coherent
COSIX
Darwin
DNIX
Domain/OS
HP-UX
illumos
IRIX
Linux
LynxOS
macOS
SCO
Solaris
SOX
SunOS
SerenityOS
Tru64 UNIX
uNETix
UNICOS
Uniplus+
Venix
Wollongong Unix
z/OS UNIX

See also
Unix-like

Unix systems